Arthur Fagan can refer to:

 Arthur Fagan (cricketer) (born 1931), Australian cricketer
 Arthur Fagan (fencer) (1890–1977), British Olympic fencer